Needingworth is a village in Cambridgeshire, England. Needingworth is in the civil parish of Holywell-cum-Needingworth. Needingworth is situated within Huntingdonshire which is a non-metropolitan district of Cambridgeshire as well as being a historic county of England.The village is attached to Holywell by a single road, connecting the two villages.

Government
Needingworth is part of the civil parish of Holywell-cum-Needingworth, which has a parish council. The parish council consists of fourteen councillors and has a parish clerk; the parish council normally meets once a month.

Needingworth was in the historic and administrative county of Huntingdonshire until 1965. From 1965, the village was part of the new administrative county of Huntingdon and Peterborough. Then in 1974, following the Local Government Act 1972, Needingworth became a part of the county of Cambridgeshire.

The second tier of local government is Huntingdonshire District Council which is a non-metropolitan district of Cambridgeshire and has its headquarters in Huntingdon. Huntingdonshire District Council has 52 councillors representing 29 district wards. Needingworth is a part of the district ward of Earith and is represented on the district council by two councillors. District councillors serve for four-year terms following elections to Huntingdonshire District Council.

For Needingworth the highest tier of local government is Cambridgeshire County Council which has administration buildings in Cambridge. Cambridgeshire County Council consists of 69 councillors representing 60 electoral divisions. Needingworth is part of the electoral division of Somersham and Earith and is represented on the county council by one councillor.

At Westminster Needingworth is in the parliamentary constituency of North West Cambridgeshire, which is represented in the House of Commons by Shailesh Vara (Conservative). Shailesh Vara has represented the constituency since 2005. The previous member of parliament was Brian Mawhinney (Conservative) who represented the constituency between 1997 and 2005.

Culture and community
There is only one shop, currently a 'One Stop', which is also a Post Office on the Needingworth high street. There are also two pubs (not including the Ferry Boat Inn in Holywell) in Needingworth, The Pike and Eel and The Queen's Head.

There is a Church-of-England primary school, a village hall with bowls club and various good walks in the area. Also tennis courts.

The Villager is the local newsletter of the area, a copy of which is delivered free to every household in the parish of Holywell-cum-Needingworth.

The quarry
There is a significant aggregate extraction operation based just to the east of Needingworth. The quarry will be turned into wetland with the co-operation of the RSPB. The resulting  wetland will constitute 50% of the UK's reedbed target.

Bus services
There are two bus routes serving the village;
Route A (Busway, Stagecoach in Huntingdonshire) to St Ives and Cambridge (peak times only)
21 (Go Whippet) to St Ives or Somersham/Ramsey

References

External links
 History of Hollywell cum Needingworth
 Quarry and wetland information
 The newsletter of Holywell-cum-Needingworth
 Local bus times

Villages in Cambridgeshire
Huntingdonshire